Agent Raghav – Crime Branch is an Indian crime fiction anthology television series, which premiered on &TV from 5 September 2015 to 10 April 2016 for one hour at Saturday and Sunday nights. The series was produced by Contiloe Entertainment of Abhimanyu Singh and starred Sharad Kelkar in the eponymous role of Agent Raghav Sinha, along with Aahana Kumra, Deepali Pansare, Danish Pandor, Jason Tham and Mahesh Manjrekar, the latter appeared in a recurring role. The serial received Indian Telly Awards in the category of Best Thriller and Horror Show and was also nominated for Best Weekend Show. The show is said to be inspired from the American police drama/mystery television series, ''The Mentalist.

Plot/Synopsis
Agent Raghav Sinha (Sharad Kelkar) is a handsome guy with charismatic personality and exceptional skills of observation and deduction. He has a very high IQ and is an expert at reading a person's mind and body language. Raghav picked up these unique skills from his father, who was a renowned psychiatrist. However, at the age of 10, Raghav witnessed his father's murder at the hands of one of his own clients. The killer was untraceable, and even the police had to give up after some time. Ever since then, it has become Raghav's mission to find the killer and avenge his father's death. Raghav was initiated into Crime Branch Special Unit because of his special, skills and he has time and again proved his worth by cracking the most challenging cases and bringing the criminals to justice.

Agent Trisha Deewan (Aahana Kumra) is the leader of the Crime Branch Special Unit. Her goal is to build up her career as a cop but her parents want her to settle down in life by marrying a nice guy. Agent Trisha & Agent Raghav, despite their opposite personalities, fell in love with each other but never voiced out. Agent Rajbir (Danish Pandor) and Agent Bikram (Jason Tham) are his friends. They share a special bond as well as solving cases. Their goal is to help the team as much as possible using their skills. Dr Aarti is the forensic scientist working under CBI. With her forensic skills, she discovers the things may happen on the crime spots. . The show also deals about the dynamics shared by Raghav and Trisha, where they both are strongly attracted to each other & share an amazing bond of trust.

In the last episode, it reveals Agent Raghav's father's killer. It is the CBI Crime Branch Chief, Dilip Chauhan. He tries to kill Raghav, but Bikram jumps in front of the bullet and dies. Then the chief escapes and leaves a tired Raghav promising to get him one day..

Cast

 Sharad Kelkar as Agent Raghav Sinha
Aahana Kumra as Agent Trisha Dewan
Mahesh Manjrekar as Dilip Chauhan - chief of the CBI Crime Branch
Deepali Pansare as Agent Gauri, ex Tech Expert 
Danish Pandor as an Agent Rajbir
Jason Tham as Agent Bikram
Reena Aggarwal as Forensic Doctor Aarti Mistry
Swati Rajput as Agent Swati – Tech Expert

Episodic appearances
 Mamik Singh as Magician Zorrino (Episode 17 & Episode 18)
 Gautam Ahuja as Young Raghav
 Rajesh Dwivedi as Magician Zorrino, Raghav's Friend 
 Sara Khan as Radhika
 Payal Rohatgi as Marzena 
 Nazea Hasan Sayed as Mihika Rajput
 Deepshikha Nagpal as Devdasi
 Gavie Chahal as Prashant Surve 
 Suchitra Pillai as Vasundhara Vohra 
 Chestha Bhagat as Sunidhi Vohra
 Alefia Kapadia as Sushma Uppel 
 Mitika Sharma as Ritu Sharma, con bride 
 Deeksha Kanwal Sonal as Sona / Pooja / Esha / Nandini
 Malini Kapoor as Flavia
 Ridheema Tiwari as Manasvi
 Rishina Kandhari as Dr. Sunaina Sinhal Mehta
 Farhaan Patel as Ratan 
 Riaa Chandra as Shruti
 Jannat Zubair Rahmani as Rohan Arora
 Sumit Kaul as Subhodh Arora
 Vimarsh Roshan as Randeep Garewal
 Amit Dolawat as Vijay Chauhan
 Ajay Kumar Nain as Inspector Sharma
 Sunayana Fozdar as Gargi Chaddha 
 Siraj Mustafa Khan as Roby
 Tarul Swami as Dr.Nigam
 Resha Konkar as Mona
 Gajendra Chauhan as Mr. Bajaj
 Ahsaas Channa as Naina
 Seema Pandey as Maya Banerjee
 Ishita Vyas as Gehna
 Rushad Rana as Rocky/ Vineet/Rishabh Tandon
 Sonali Nikam as Akansha
 Akshay Sethi as Sumit
 Ekroop Bedi as Alpana 
 Jyoti Gauba as Arundhati Devi
 Aashish Kaul as Mr. Joshi
 Nidhi Jha as Christie Xavier
 Kunal Bakshi as Inspector Srivastav
 Naresh Suri as Marconi
 Rohit Tailor as PSI
 Muskaan Nancy James
 Poorti Arya

References

External links

 

2015 Indian television series debuts
2016 Indian television series endings
Hindi-language television shows
Indian crime television series
&TV original programming